The straits of Tiran are the narrow sea passages between the Sinai and Arabian peninsulas that connect the Gulf of Aqaba and the Red Sea. The Multinational Force and Observers monitors the compliance of Egypt in maintaining freedom of navigation of the straits, as provided under the Egypt–Israel peace treaty.

The body is named after Tiran Island, located at its entrance  from the Sinai.  Sanafir Island lies to the east of Tiran, southeast of the shallow strait between Tiran and Saudi Arabia.

The blockade of Israeli passage through the Suez Canal and Straits of Tiran led to two wars, in 1956 and 1967.

Background 

International documents inconsistently refer to both the "Straits of Tiran" and the "Strait of Tiran". There are several passages formed by the islands between Egypt and Saudi Arabia. It has two passages deep enough to be navigable by large ships.

Closure between 1948-56 and 1967 

Access to Jordan's only seaport of Aqaba and to Israel's only Red Sea seaport of Eilat is through the Gulf of Aqaba, which gives the Straits of Tiran strategic importance. In 1967, 90% of Israeli oil passed through the Straits of Tiran, making it a target of Egyptian blockade during the Arab League boycott of Israel.

In May 1967, Israeli Prime Minister Levi Eshkol repeated declarations that Israel had made in 1957, saying that closure of the Straits of Tiran would be an act of war. Egypt then blockaded the straits on May 22, 1967, and oil tankers that were due to pass through the straits were required to submit documents ensuring their cargo was not destined for an Israeli port. At that time, Israel viewed the Straits of Tiran as a vital interest as it is where Israel received vital imports, mainly oil from Iran, and a blockade threatened Israel's ability to develop the Negev.

In May 1967, Major General Indar Jit Rikhye was the commander of the United Nations Emergency Force (UNEF) in the Sinai peninsula when Egypt deployed its own troops in that territory and demanded that Rikhye withdraw all of his troops. Rikhye did withdraw, including from the port at Sharm El Sheikh adjacent to the straits. The subsequent closure of the Tiran Straits by Egypt was closely linked to the preceding UNEF withdrawal, because having the peacekeepers (rather than the Egyptian military) at Sharm El Sheikh was important for keeping that waterway open. Later in life, General Rikhye sought to downplay the importance that Israel attached to keeping that waterway open, saying that Israel's accusation in 1967 of a blockade was "questionable" given that an Israeli-flagged ship had not passed through the straits in two years, and that "The U.A.R. [Egyptian] navy had searched a couple of ships after the establishment of the blockade and thereafter relaxed its implementation". Egypt had initially requested UNEF withdrawal from locations other than Sharm El Sheikh, but UN Secretary-General U Thant demanded an all-or-nothing withdrawal.

The US President at the time, Lyndon Johnson, said the following about closure of these straits being a cause of the Six-Day War:

If a single act of folly was more responsible for this explosion than any other, it was the arbitrary and dangerous announced decision that the Straits of Tiran would be closed. The right of innocent, maritime passage must be preserved for all nations.

Bridge project 
A project to build a  bridge across the straits, linking Egypt and Saudi Arabia, is under consideration by the Egyptian government (see Saudi–Egypt Causeway).

See also 

 Sanafir Island
 Suez Crisis
 Six-Day War
 Yom Kippur War
 Closure of the Suez Canal (1967–1975)
 The Line, Saudi Arabia
 Saudi–Egypt Causeway -  proposed bridge over the Straits of Tiran from Saudi Arabia to Egypt
 Tiran Island
 Israeli passage through the Suez Canal and Straits of Tiran

References

External links 

 Descriptions, pictures and videos of some Straits of Tiran dive spots
 One of the wrecks in the Straits of Tiran
 "The Strait of Tiran and the Sovereignty of the Sea" by Anthony S. Reyner
 Photo Gallery: Bridging the Red Sea, Spiegel Online

Tiran
Tiran
Tiran
International straits
Bodies of water of Egypt
Bodies of water of Saudi Arabia
Borders of Egypt
Borders of Saudi Arabia